Edward Sixsmith  (February 26, 1863 – December 12, 1926) was a baseball player who played catcher in the Major Leagues in one game for the 1884 Philadelphia Quakers. He appeared in his game on September 11, 1884 and failed to record a hit in two at-bats. He played minor league ball from 1884–1888.

External links

1863 births
1926 deaths
Major League Baseball catchers
Philadelphia Quakers players
19th-century baseball players
Augusta Browns players
Bridgeport Giants players
Buffalo Bisons (minor league) players
Utica Pent Ups players
San Antonio Missionaries players
San Antonio Cowboys players
Canton Nadjys players
Baseball players from Philadelphia